Bigelow's ray (Rajella bigelowi), also called the chocolate skate or Bigelow's skate, is a species of skate in the family Rajidae. It is named in honour of the oceanographer Henry Bryant Bigelow.

Distribution

Bigelow's ray lives on continental slopes and deepwater rises around the edges of the Atlantic Ocean.

Description 

Like all rays, Bigelow's ray has a flattened body with broad, wing-like pectoral fins. The body is sub-rhomboid. It is dark on the dorsal surface, with the outer edges of the disc and pelvic fins shading to a slightly darker colour.

Behaviour

Bigelow's ray feeds on small benthic crustaceans.

Life cycle 

Bigelow's ray is oviparous. The eggs are oblong capsules with stiff pointed horns at the corners; they are deposited in sandy or muddy flats.

It is parasitised by Ditrachybothridium macrocephalum (tapeworms of the order Diphyllidea).

See also

References

External links
 

bigelowi
Fish of the Atlantic Ocean
Fish of the Gulf of Mexico
bigelows ray
Taxa named by Matthias Stehmann